G104 may refer to:
 China National Highway 104 or G104
 Grob G104 Speed Astir, a competition sailplane produced in Germany in the late 1970s